WNLO can refer to:

 WNLO (TV), a television station (channel 36, virtual 23) licensed to serve Buffalo, New York, United States
 WNLO-CD, a Class A television station (channel 14, virtual 45) licensed to serve Norfolk, Virginia, United States